Mário A. T. Figueiredo (born January 5, 1962) is a Portuguese engineer, academic, and researcher. He is an IST Distinguished Professor and holds the Feedzai chair of machine learning at IST, University of Lisbon.

Figueiredo's research interests include signal and image processing, focusing on image inverse problems, along with machine learning, with a focus on statistical approaches. Additionally, he has worked on applications to medical imaging and remote sensing, and mathematical optimization applied to imaging inverse problems and machine learning.

Figueiredo is a Fellow of EURASIP (European Association for Signal Processing), IEEE (Institute of Electrical and Electronics Engineers) and of IAPR (International Association of Pattern Recognition). He is a Senior Editor at the IEEE Signal Processing Magazine and at IEEE Transactions on Computational Imaging and he was also an Associate Editor at SIAM Journal on Imaging Science, and many other journals. He is an ELLIS Fellow, and the head of LUMLIS, the Lisbon ELLIS unit.

Education
In 1990, Figueiredo received his master's degree from the Instituto Superior Técnico (IST) at the University of Lisbon, Portugal in Electrical and Computer Engineering. He also earned his Ph.D. and his habilitation (Agregação) in Electrical and Computer Engineering from the same institute in 1994 and 2004 respectively.

Career
Figueiredo began his academic career in 1994 as an assistant professor of the Department of Electrical and Computer Engineering at IST, University of Lisbon. From 2004 to 2010, he became an associate professor there. Since then, he has been promoted to full professor and in 2019, an IST Distinguished Professor for the same department. He is also the Feedzai Professor of machine learning at the same university since 2019.

Figueiredo has been a visiting scholar of the Department of Computer Science and Engineering at the Michigan State University in 1998 and also of the Department of Electrical and Computer Engineering at the University of Wisconsin in 2005 and 2014.

Research
Figueiredo has authored over 360 publications. He has focused his research on machine learning, signal processing and image processing, with particular attention on imaging inverse problems, probabilistic/statistical approaches, and applications to medical imaging and remote sensing.

Signal processing and image processing
Figueiredo proposed gradient projection (GP) algorithms, and discussed their application in terms of the bound-constrained quadratic programming (BCQP) formulation of compressed sensing and other inverse problems. He also provided sparse approximate solutions to large underdetermined linear systems of equations and regarded them a common problem in signal/image processing and statistics. In 2010, he co-authored pioneering work on the usage of ADMM (alternating direction method of multipliers) for imaging inverse problems, namely image deblurring. Furthermore, he described first application of the ADMM regarding the restoration of images corrupted with Poisson noise, and to solve the problem of hyperspectral unmixing, a central problem in hyperspectral imaging, widely used in remote sensing.

In 2003, he proposed the first efficient algorithm for wavelet-based image restoration.

Machine learning
In his paper published in 2003, Figueiredo described a hierarchical Bayesian approach to adaptive sparse regularization in supervised learning. He also focused his study on mixture models, and published a paper which seamlessly integrates model estimation and selection in an unsupervised algorithm. He highlighted the concept of feature saliency and introduced an expectation-maximization (EM) algorithm to estimate it, in the context of mixture-based clustering. In 2005, he proposed the first fast algorithm for sparse logistic regression. He also explored a new family of nonextensive mutual information kernels, which includes the Boolean, Jensen-Shannon, and linear kernels as particular cases.

Awards and honors
1995 - Portuguese IBM Scientific Prize
2009 - Fellow, International Association for Pattern Recognition (IAPR)
2010 - Fellow, Institute of Electrical and Electronics Engineers (IEEE)
2011 - IEEE Signal Processing Society Best Paper Award
2014 - W. R. G. Baker Award, IEEE
2016 - Individual Technical Achievement Award, EURASIP 
2016 - Pierre Devijver Award, IAPR 
2019 - Member, the Portuguese Academy of Engineering 
2019 - Corresponding Member, the Lisbon Academy of Sciences 
2019 - Holder of the endowed chair “Feedzai Professor of Machine Learning” at IST.
2020 - Fellow, EURASIP

Bibliography
Figueiredo, M. A., Nowak, R. D., & Wright, S. J. (2007). Gradient projection for sparse reconstruction: Application to compressed sensing and other inverse problems. IEEE Journal of selected topics in signal processing, 1(4), 586–597.
Figueiredo, M. A. T., & Jain, A. K. (2002). Unsupervised learning of finite mixture models. IEEE Transactions on pattern analysis and machine intelligence, 24(3), 381–396.
Wright, S. J., Nowak, R. D., & Figueiredo, M. A. (2009). Sparse reconstruction by separable approximation. IEEE Transactions on signal processing, 57(7), 2479–2493.
Bioucas-Dias, J. M., & Figueiredo, M. A. (2007). A new TwIST: Two-step iterative shrinkage/thresholding algorithms for image restoration. IEEE Transactions on Image processing, 16(12), 2992–3004.
Figueiredo, M. A., & Nowak, R. D. (2003). An EM algorithm for wavelet-based image restoration. IEEE Transactions on Image Processing, 12(8), 906–916.

References 

Portuguese engineers
Fellow Members of the IEEE
University of Lisbon alumni
Instituto Superior Técnico alumni
1962 births
Living people